Hans Daniel Melchers (born 18 May 1938 in Apeldoorn) is a Dutch businessman. Melchers founded Melchemie Holland BV, and is major (15%) shareholder in HAL Investments BV. With a total capital of €460 million, Melchers reached a 36th spot in the 2005 edition of the Quote 500-list of the most wealthy Dutch.

On the Forbes 2019 list of the world's billionaires, he was ranked #916 with a net worth of US$2.5 billion.

Since the early 1990s until 2007, Melchers was a major sponsor of the Dutch Bridge Federation (NBB).  In 2008 Melchers started his own professional bridge team.
He "provided major funding for the 2011 world bridge championship held in the Netherlands" (in Veldhoven, hosted by NBB).

His daughter, Claudia, was the victim of a kidnapping in September 2005. She was released after two days of confinement.

References

1938 births
Living people
Dutch businesspeople
Dutch billionaires
People from Apeldoorn
Dutch contract bridge players